The secretary of state of Wisconsin is an officer of the executive branch of the government of the U.S. state of Wisconsin and the second in the order of succession of the governor of Wisconsin, behind the lieutenant governor.  The secretary of state is responsible for keeping records of the official acts of the legislative and executive branches of Wisconsin's government and affixing the Great Seal of the State of Wisconsin to the official acts of the governor.

As second in the order of succession to Wisconsin's governorship, the secretary of state becomes governor if the governor dies, resigns or is removed from office while the lieutenant governorship is vacant; prior to a 1979 amendment to the Wisconsin Constitution, however, the secretary simply became acting governor if any of these events were to occur. No secretary of state has ever ascended to the governorship or acting-governorship under such circumstances. Both before and after the 1979 amendment, the secretary becomes acting governor while the governor is absent from the state, impeached or incapacitated in the absence of a lieutenant governor. Some secretaries of state have acted as governor for short periods of time under such circumstances.

Under the original terms of the state constitution, the secretary of state was elected for a two-year term on a separate ticket from the governor or any other official. A 1967 amendment increased the term of the secretary of state, as well as those of other state officials, to four years. There is no limit to the number of terms a secretary of state may hold. In the event of the death, resignation or removal from office of the secretary of state, the governor may appoint someone to fill the vacancy.

Twenty-eight individuals have held the office of secretary of state since Wisconsin's admission to the Union in 1848, two of whom—Fred Zimmerman and Douglas La Follette—served for non-consecutive terms.  The first secretary of state was Thomas McHugh, who took office on June 7, 1848. The current secretary is Sarah Godlewski, who took office on March 17, 2023; her current term expires in 2027.

Secretaries of state

Secretaries of Wisconsin Territory 
From 1836 until 1848, what is now Wisconsin was part of Wisconsin Territory.  The Organic Act which created the territory provided for the office of a secretary, to be appointed by the president, whose duties consisted of recording the proceedings of the territory's legislature, and the laws it produced, as well as the proceedings of the territorial governor.  Additionally, in the event of the inability of the governor to serve—due to death or various other circumstances—the secretary was to assume the governor's powers and carry out his duties.

Wisconsin Territory was formed on July 3, 1836. During the time of its existence, it had six territorial secretaries.

Secretaries of state of Wisconsin 
Wisconsin was admitted to the Union on May 29, 1848.  Since then, it has had 29 secretaries of state, two of whom served non-consecutive terms.

Notes

Other high offices held 
This is a table of governorships, lieutenant governorships, congressional seats, and ranking diplomatic positions in foreign countries held by former Wisconsin secretaries of state.

References 

Secretary of State
Secretaries of State of Wisconsin